Everyday Life in a Syrian Village is a Syrian documentary film by the director Omar Amiralay. The film was ranked #55 on the Dubai International Film Festival's 2013 list of the top 100 Arab films.

Awards
Berlin International Film Festival - Interfilm Award - Otto Dibelius Film Award, 1976.
 Prix spécial du Jury - Festival de Toulon, 1976.

References

External links
 

1970s Arabic-language films
1974 films
Syrian black-and-white films
Syrian documentary films
Films directed by Omar Amiralay
1974 documentary films
Documentary films about economics
Documentary films about agriculture
Documentary films about Syria